Thomas O'Hara (1911–1984) was an Irish politician, merchant and auctioneer.

Thomas or Tom O'Hara may also refer to:

Tom O'Hara (1942–2019),American runner
Thomas J. O'Hara (born 1949), Catholic priest
Tom O'Hara (baseball) (1880–1954), outfielder in Major League Baseball
Tom O'Hara, character in The 13th Man
Tommy O'Hara (1952–2016), Scottish former footballer